Kinfra Textile Park Taliparamba is a textile park situated in Nadukani, near to Taliparamba in Kannur district. The textile park was established by Kinfra to provide infrastructure and other related facilities for the textile industry. There are 50 companies in Nadukani Textile Park.

Infrastructure & Facilities

 Uninterrupted Power supply
 Water supply
 Standard design Factory
 Communication Systems
 Hazardous waste disposal system
 Dyeing and winding plant 
 Single window clearance system

References

See also

Buildings and structures in Kannur district
Textile industry of India